Län (Len, or Dapo, Dungerwab, Parb, Tuj) is a Yam language spoken in Western Province, Papua New Guinea.

References

Nambu languages
Languages of Western Province (Papua New Guinea)